Reginald Wood (7 March 1860 – 6 January 1915) was an English cricketer.

The son of John Wood, a Birkenhead merchant, and Montreal-born Elizabeth, he was educated at Charterhouse and played six matches for Lancashire County Cricket Club as an amateur before emigrating to Australia. In 1885, he played two matches as a professional for Victoria, and then, when Billy Barnes was ruled out of a number of matches in Alfred Shaw's tour of Australia in 1886-87 after Barnes hit a wall rather than Australian captain Percy McDonnell, whom he was aiming for, the Englishmen had to find a replacement quickly. Wood was found and played three matches for Shaw's XI, the second one of which was the Second Test. He did not bowl and batted at number ten, scoring 0 and 6 and after one final game with the touring Englishmen never played first-class cricket again.

His life story is covered in the book Finally a Face: A Memoir of Reginald Wood by Philip Paine, which was published in 2007.

References

1860 births
1915 deaths
People educated at Charterhouse School
England Test cricketers
English cricketers
Lancashire cricketers
Victoria cricketers
Liverpool and District cricketers